Panagiotis Papoulias (born 9 December 1969) is a Greek former track and field athlete who competing middle- and long-distance running events. His greatest achievement was a bronze medal at the 1996 European Athletics Indoor Championships. He was a two-time participant at the World Championships in Athletics (1995 and 1997) and also ran at the 1998 IAAF World Cross Country Championships and 1998 European Athletics Championships.

Papoulias was a six-time national champion at the Greek Athletics Championships, winning two 1500 metres titles and four over 5000 metres. He is the Greek national record holder in the 3000 m and 5000 m events with personal bests of 7:44.26 minutes and 13:28.59 minutes, respectively, as well as the Greek record holder for the 10000 m in the M35 category. He also holds the national indoor records for the 1500 m (3:39.63) and 3000 m (7:43.66). He was a member of GS Ilioupolis, Olympiacos and AEK during his career.

He was a double bronze medallist in the 3000 metres and 5000 m at the 1997 European Cup. He was the first long-distance medallist for Greece at the European Athletics Indoor Championships and as of 2016, remains the only such Greek athlete.

Since September 2016 he is serving as a managing director for Panathinaikos youth academies, the team he is a fan of since childhood, as he stated.

Personal bests
Outdoor
1500 m – 3:37.38 min (1997)
3000 m – 7:44.26 min (1996)
5000 m – 13:28.59 min (1995)
10,000 m – 29:18.85 min (2003)
3000 m s'chase – 8:28.62 min (1999)
Indoor
1500 m – 3:39.63 min (1998)
3000 m – 7:43.66 min (1998)
 All info from IAAF and All Athletics

National titles
Greek Athletics Championships
1500 m: 1995, 1998
5000 m: 1993, 1994, 1998, 2003

International competitions

References

External links

Living people
1969 births
Greek male long-distance runners
Greek male steeplechase runners
World Athletics Championships athletes for Greece
Athletes from Athens